Hibbertia solanifolia is a species of flowering plant in the family Dilleniaceae and is endemic to the Top End of the Northern Territory in Australia. It is a spreading to low-lying shrub with ridged branches, elliptic leaves and yellow flowers usually arranged singly in leaf axils, with 34 to 38 stamens arranged in groups around three densely scaly carpels.

Description
The foliage is covered with rosette-like hairs.

Taxonomy
Hibbertia solanifolia was first formally described in 2010 by Hellmut R. Toelken in the Journal of the Adelaide Botanic Gardens from specimens collected by Clyde Robert Dunlop near Nourlangie Creek in 1973. The specific epithet (solanifolia) means "Solanum-leaved", referring to the similarity of the leaves to those of some Australian species of Solanum.

Distribution and habitat
This hibbertia grows in sandy soils near watercourses and on sandstone near the Alligator and Goomadeer Rivers areas in the Top End of the Northern Territory.

Conservation status
Hibbertia solanifolia is classified as "near threatened" under the Northern Territory Government Northern Territory Government Territory Parks and Wildlife Conservation Act 1976.

See also
List of Hibbertia species

References

solanifolia
Flora of Western Australia
Plants described in 2010
Taxa named by Hellmut R. Toelken